"Tokyo" is the fourth single by the Japanese artist Yui. It was released January 18, 2006, under Sony Records.

The title track recounts her feelings as she left her hometown of Fukuoka to go to Tokyo, pursuing her music dreams according to the lyrics of the song.

The music video was directed by Takahiro Miki.

Track listing

Oricon Sales Chart (Japan)

References

2006 singles
Yui (singer) songs
Songs written by Yui (singer)
Songs about Tokyo
2005 songs
Sony Music Entertainment Japan singles